Mount Greene is a mountain,  high, at the south side of the mouth of Freimanis Glacier at the point the latter joins Tucker Glacier, in the Admiralty Mountains of Antarctica. It was mapped by the United States Geological Survey (USGS) from surveys and U.S. Navy air photos, 1960–62, and was named by the Advisory Committee on Antarctic Names for First Lieutenant John H. Greene, U.S. Army, commander of the helicopter detachment that supported the USGS Topo North–South survey of the area, 1961–62.

References

Mountains of Victoria Land
Borchgrevink Coast